Flower Hill Village Park (formerly known as Flower Hill County Park) is a village-owned park in the Incorporated Village of Flower Hill, on Long Island, in the State of New York. It was formerly owned by Nassau County.

Park description

History 
The 6.38-acre (2.58 ha) park was originally operated by Nassau County, as Flower Hill County Park, and was developed in the early 1960s. In 2006, the park was purchased by the Village of Flower Hill, along with the portion of Stonytown Road located within the Village.

The park underwent major renovations and enhancements in the 2010s, including updated landscaping, a playground, and sports facilities.

In 2011, a playground was added to the park for children between the ages of 2 and 5, with funding allocated by a grant from the Nassau County Legislature. The playground opened in the fall of that year.

In July 2014, Flower Hill officials - including Elaine Phillips (who was then the Mayor of Flower Hill), along with then-New York State Senator Jack Martins - opened a new basketball court in the park.

On August 1, 2016, village officials opened an additional section of the playground for children between the ages of 5 and 12.

Location 
The park is located off of Port Washington Boulevard (NY 101), between Stonytown Road and Bonnie Heights Road. Parking is available along Stonytown Road, adjacent to the park, as well as at Village Hall (located across from the park's Bonnie Heights Road entrance). 

The Village's Stonytown Road bicycle/pedestrian path terminates at the park.

References

External links 

 Village of Flower Hill official website

Flower Hill, New York
Parks in Nassau County, New York